John Talbot, 2nd Earl of Shrewsbury, 2nd Earl of Waterford, 8th Baron Talbot, KG (12 December 1413 – 10 July 1460) was an English nobleman and soldier. He was the son of John Talbot, 1st Earl of Shrewsbury, 1st Earl of Waterford, 7th Baron Talbot, 10th Baron Strange of Blackmere, and Maud Neville, 6th Baroness Furnivall.

John Talbot also held the subsidiary titles of 11th Baron Strange of Blackmere and 7th Baron Furnivall. He was knighted in 1426 at Leicester alongside King Henry VI. During his father's lifetime, he served as Lord Chancellor of Ireland. He was a Lancastrian, and served as Lord High Treasurer from 1456 to 1458, besides being created a Knight of the Garter in 1457. He was killed at the Battle of Northampton.<ref>Alison Weir Lancaster and York- the Wars of the Roses' Arrow edition 1996 p. 244'</ref>

Early life
The eldest son and heir to the Barony of Furnivall, John was born at Sheffield Castle, where his mother was resident. Still a boy he was knighted in 1426 by Henry VI. He was granted the manor of Worksop in 1435/6 aeternas maternis belong to his mother in her own lifetime. He made his will at Sheffield the year after marriage to Lady Elizabeth, a daughter of James Butler, 4th Earl of Ormonde and Joan de Beauchamp. Her maternal grandparents were William Beauchamp, 1st Baron Bergavenny and Joan Fitzalan. Joan was a daughter of Richard FitzAlan, 11th Earl of Arundel and Elizabeth de Bohun. Elizabeth was a daughter of William de Bohun, 1st Earl of Northampton.

The marriage between John and Elizabeth seems to have been an attempt to heal the old feud between the Talbot and Butler families, which had dominated Irish politics for many years and greatly weakened the authority of the English Crown in Ireland.

They had seven children: 
Lady Anne Talbot (c. 1445 – 17 May 1494). Married firstly Sir Henry Vernon and secondly Ralph Shirley.
John Talbot, 3rd Earl of Shrewsbury (12 December 1448 – 28 June 1473).
Sir James Talbot (c. 1450 – 2 September 1471).
Sir Gilbert Talbot, KG (1452 – 16 August 1517 or 19 September 1518). Married first Elizabeth Greystoke, daughter of Ralph de Greystoke, the 5th Baron Greystoke/7th Baron Boteler of Wem; and secondly, to Etheldreda, also called Audrey, Cotton, daughter of William Landwade Cotton of Landwade, Cambridgeshire.
Christopher Talbot (c. 1454 – aft. 1474). Rector at Christchurch, Shropshire.
Sir George Talbot (born c. 1456).
Margaret Talbot (born c. 1460). Married Thomas Chaworth (died a lunatic 1482–1483), son of Sir William Chaworth and Elizabeth Bowett, without issue.

 Diplomat, Courtier and Statesman 

Raised by his mother in the West Riding and estates around Sherwood Forest, his father was almost continually away in Ireland and France. Made Chancellor of Ireland by his father in March 1445, he remained until the new Viceroy, the duke of York appeared in Dublin in 1447. 

Sent back there two years later, York accused the Lancastrian of trying to ambush the column at Holt, after he had lost most of his inheritance to Shrewsbury's new marriage. He moved into the majority court of Queen Margaret before Cade's Revolt. At Dartford, he was already indicting Yorkist traitors at law. He harboured some resentment against the young strutting duke, whose somewhat vain, and at times arrogant posturing annoyed him.

On the inheritance of the earldom, he had already felt confident to speak out against York's conduct as Lord Lieutenant of Ireland. And reaching this majority in the House of Lords, attracted the allegiance of his brother-in-law, James, earl of Ormond. During the Protectorate, but once York's party had left London, he sat in oyer et terminer on the traitor Henry Percy in June 1454. He was appointed Keeper of the Seas in the North.

Choosing the Northern affinity his friendship was for Ralph, Lord Cromwell, and less for his mother's clan, the Nevilles. They marched south to the First Battle of St Albans in 1455. After an indecisive encounter, Warwick sought Shrewsbury's side, and in so doing picked a fight with Cromwell. The latter died soon afterwards, and Shrewsbury threw his lot in with York and Warwick now a united party. He supported the preferment of George Neville to archbishop.

Realising the possible treachery of the 'professional army' of York he sided with Queen Margaret, by whom he was raised to Lord Treasurer of England on 14 September 1456. Talbot's tenure as Lord High Treasurer occurred during the Great Bullion Famine and the Great Slump in England. He attended on the royal party's progress through the Midlands in late 1456. During the month-long Great Council at the palace of Coventry, some MPs told him he should be fighting the French. 

He continued a policy of taxation to pay for the King's Exchequer's debts, and fines in court pleadings. The following year he arranged the Loveday Award in which Earl of Devon was encouraged to act as mediator for his friend the duke of York. Margaret's attempt to break out peace in the realm failed, while at his greatest sharing power with Wiltshire, Shrewsbury was made a Knight of the Garter, Keeper of the Royal Mews, and Chief Butler.

Far from a competent Treasurer, he gave way to Wiltshire after one year at the Great Council for Westminster in October 1458. Sent to become Chief Justice of Cheshire in 1459 he helped parliament ban the Yorkists by law. 

On 10 July 1460, during the Battle of Northampton he was found by York and retainers near the King's tent and hacked to death.

See also
 List of Lord High Treasurers of England and Great Britain

References

Bibliography

 R A Griffiths, The reign of Henry VI: the exercise of royal authority (1981)
 R A Griffiths, King and Country: England and Wales in the fifteenth century
 A.J.Pollard, 'The family of Talbot, Lord Talbot and earls of Shrewsbury in the fifteenth century', PhD diss., University of Bristol, 1968.
 J Watts, Henry VI and the politics of kingship'' (1996)

External links

|-

|-

|-

1413 births
1460 deaths
15th-century English nobility
Knights of the Garter
Lord High Treasurers of England
People of the Wars of the Roses
English military personnel killed in action
John
Earls of Shrewsbury
Earls of Waterford
Barons Talbot
Barons Strange of Blackmere